Kargalytamak (Qarğalıtamaq) is a rural locality (a village) in Kargalinsky Selsoviet, Blagovarsky District, Bashkortostan, Russia. The population was 80 as of 2010. There is 1 street.

Geography 
Kargalytamak is located 29 km southwest of Yazykovo (the district's administrative centre) by road. Nizhniye Kargaly is the nearest rural locality.

References 

Rural localities in Blagovarsky District